Stewart-Studebaker House, also known as the John Studebaker Residence, is a historic home located at Bluffton, Wells County, Indiana.  It was built in 1882, and is a two-story, Second Empire style red brick dwelling topped by a slate mansard roof.  It features a Mansarded tower above the main entrance.

Reported Ghost, Local legends claim that this residence is the dwelling place of the "Studebaker Ghost". Claims range from lights on at night, to ghastly faces in the windows. These are probably nothing more than tales told by Bluffton school children to scare their friends, but it is a legend that ties a community together in folklore.

It was listed on the National Register of Historic Places in 1979.

References

Houses on the National Register of Historic Places in Indiana
Second Empire architecture in Indiana
Houses completed in 1882
Buildings and structures in Wells County, Indiana
National Register of Historic Places in Wells County, Indiana